|}

This is a list of Legislative Council results for the Victorian 1961 state election. 17 of the 34 seats were contested.

Results by province

Ballarat

Bendigo

Doutta Galla

East Yarra 

 Two party preferred vote was estimated.

Gippsland

Higinbotham 

 Two party preferred vote was estimated.

Melbourne 

Two party preferred vote was estimated.

Melbourne North 

 Two party preferred vote was estimated.

Melbourne West 

Two party preferred vote was estimated.

Monash

Northern 

 Two party preferred vote was estimated.

North Eastern

North Western 

 Two party preferred vote was estimated.

Southern

South Eastern

South Western

Western

See also 

 1961 Victorian state election
 Candidates of the 1961 Victorian state election
 Members of the Victorian Legislative Council, 1961–1964

References 

Results of Victorian state elections
1960s in Victoria (Australia)